The Rural Municipality of Key West No. 70 is a rural municipality (RM) in the Canadian province of Saskatchewan within Census Division No. 2 and  Division No. 2. It is located in the southwest portion of the province.

History 
The RM of Key West No. 70 incorporated as a rural municipality on December 12, 1910. The municipality had a post office from 1908 to 1926. It was named for Key West, Florida.

Geography

Communities and localities 
The following urban municipalities are surrounded by the RM.

Towns
 Ogema

The following unincorporated communities are within the RM.

Localities
 Bures
 Dahinda
 Edgeworth
 Glasnevin
 Kayville
 Key West
 Querrin

The RM also surrounds a portion of the Piapot Cree First Nation 75H.

Demographics 

Government 
The RM of Key West No. 70 is governed by an elected municipal council and an appointed administrator that meets on the first Thursday of every month. The reeve of the RM is Zane McKerricher while its administrator is Yvonne Johnston. The RM's office is located in Ogema.

References 

K

Division No. 2, Saskatchewan